Dalli is a surname of Italian origin, and has a related Spanish surname form Dali. Notable people with the surname include:
Helena Dalli, Maltese politician
John Dalli (born 1948), prominent Maltese politician, European Commissioner in the second Barroso Commission
Angelo Dalli (born 1978), prominent Maltese computer scientist 
Larissa Dalli, Gibraltarian dancer
Toni Dalli (born 1980), Italian musician and restaurant owner

Italian-language surnames